Rinaldo dall'Arpa (b. late 16th century – 12 July 1603) was an Italian composer, singer, and harpist. He was a valuable member of Carlo Gesualdo's retinue, and accompanied him to Ferrara on the occasion of Gesualdo's marriage in 1594. He may have remained in Ferrara as a member of the Este court until its dissolution in 1598. He wrote at least two keyboard pieces which survive.

Notes
Roland Jackson. "Rinaldo dall'Arpa", Grove Music Online, ed. L. Macy, grovemusic.com (subscription access).

References

16th-century births
1603 deaths
Italian male classical composers
Italian classical composers
Italian male singers
Renaissance composers